The Man with the Iron Heart (released as HHhH in France and Killing Heydrich in Canada) is a 2017 biographical action-thriller film directed by Cédric Jimenez and written by David Farr, Audrey Diwan, and Jimenez. An English-language French-Belgian production, it is based on French writer Laurent Binet's 2010 novel HHhH, and focuses on Operation Anthropoid, the assassination of Nazi leader Reinhard Heydrich in Prague during World War II.

The film stars Jason Clarke, Rosamund Pike, Jack O'Connell, Jack Reynor, and Mia Wasikowska. It was shot in Prague and Budapest from September 2015 until February 2016.

Plot 
Reinhard Heydrich is serving as an officer in the German Navy. After beginning a relationship with Lina, he is court-martialled for breaking his word to another woman he had been having sex with. He marries Lina and follows her in joining the Nazi Party and idolising Adolf Hitler. He meets Heinrich Himmler and is appointed head of SS counter-intelligence, working with Heinrich Müller to fight Communists in Weimar Germany. After Hitler is appointed Chancellor, Heydrich becomes Chief of the Gestapo.

After the German Invasion of Poland and World War II breaks out, Heydrich is promoted to Chief of the Reich Security Main Office. His Einsatzgruppen mobile death squads follow the German Army, committing genocide across Eastern Europe. He blackmails General Eduard Wagner into sending the Einzsatzgruppen information to allow them to exterminate Jews and other Untermenschen. In September 1941, Heydrich is appointed Acting Reich Protector of the Protectorate of Bohemia and Moravia, declaring that he will turn Prague into a "Jew-free" city. On 22 January 1942, Heydrich chairs the Wannsee Conference, to ensure there is a "Final Solution" for the genocide of Jews. In May 1942, Heydrich is attacked by Czech resistance fighters.

Cast 
 Jason Clarke as SS-Obergruppenführer Reinhard Heydrich
 Rosamund Pike as Lina Heydrich
 Stephen Graham as Reichsführer-SS Heinrich Himmler
 Jack O'Connell as Jan Kubiš
 Jack Reynor as Jozef Gabčík
 Mia Wasikowska as Anna Novak
 Gilles Lellouche as Václav Morávek
 Tom Wright as Josef Valčík
 Enzo Cilenti as Adolf Opálka
 Adam Nagaitis as Karel Čurda
 Geoff Bell as SS-Gruppenführer Heinrich Müller
 Volker Bruch as SS-Obersturmbannführer Walter Schellenberg
 Barry Atsma as SS-Gruppenführer Karl Hermann Frank
 Noah Jupe as Ata Moravec
 David Rintoul as General der Artillerie Eduard Wagner
 Vernon Dobtcheff as Emil Hácha
 Ian Redford as SA-Stabschef Ernst Röhm
 David Horovich as Vizeadmiral Gottfried Hansen
 Oscar Kennedy as Milic Zelenka

Production 
The film is based on Laurent Binet's novel HHhH about Operation Anthropoid, the assassination of Nazi leader Reinhard Heydrich in Prague. The title is an acronym for Himmlers Hirn heißt Heydrich ("Himmler's brain is called Heydrich"), a quip about Heydrich said to have circulated in Nazi Germany. Cédric Jimenez directed the film based on the script he co-wrote with David Farr and Audrey Diwan, which was financed by Légende Films, Adama Pictures, Echo Lake Entertainment and FilmNation Entertainment. Alain Goldman and Simon Istolainen produced the film. Principal photography on the film began on 14 September 2015 in Prague and Budapest, and concluded on 1 February 2016. On 28 October 2015, The Weinstein Company acquired the American distribution rights to the film. However, due to their bankruptcy soon after, the film was never released in the United States.

Reception

Boyd van Hoeij of The Hollywood Reporter wrote: "Finally less a two-stories-for-the-price-of-one situation than essentially two films of about an hour each, this is nonetheless a visually impressive Hollywood calling card for Jimenez, who almost manages to overcome the material’s structural weaknesses with impressive directorial verve."

See also
 Operation Anthropoid

Other films on this subject
 Hangmen Also Die! (1943)
 Hitler's Madman (1943)
 The Silent Village (1943)
 Atentát (1964)
 Operation Daybreak (1975)
 Conspiracy (2001)
 Lidice (2011)
 Anthropoid'' (2016)

References

External links 
 
 

2017 films
Belgian action thriller films
English-language French films
English-language Belgian films
Films about Operation Anthropoid
Reinhard Heydrich
Films set in Prague
Films shot in the Czech Republic
Films shot in Budapest
French action thriller films
French war drama films
2010s action war films
2017 war drama films
2017 thriller drama films
Films based on French novels
Films set in 1942
French historical drama films
Films based on historical novels
Films based on thriller novels
FilmNation Entertainment films
Films about assassinations
Films about Nazi Germany
Films directed by Cédric Jimenez
2017 drama films
French World War II films
Holocaust films
2010s English-language films
2010s French films